Saif Farghani (in full, Molānā Sayf-edin Muhammad Farghānī) was a 13th-14th century Persian poet. He was born in Farghāneh, a city in Transoxiana and died in 1348 (749 Hijri) in Aqsara in modern-day Turkey.

He uses the Khorasani style in his poetry. His poems are in simple Persian and use less mixed Arabic vocabulary. He considers Saadi a master of Persian poetry and follows in his footsteps, according to his own poetry.

References

Year of birth missing
1348 deaths
13th-century Iranian people
14th-century Iranian people
13th-century Persian-language poets
14th-century Persian-language poets